Girsu (Sumerian ; cuneiform ) was a city of ancient Sumer, situated some  northwest of Lagash, at the site of modern Tell Telloh, Dhi Qar Governorate, Iraq.

History

Girsu was possibly inhabited in the Ubaid period (5300-4800 BC), but significant levels of activity began in the Early Dynastic period (2900-2335 BC). At the time of Gudea, during the Second Dynasty of Lagash, Girsu became the capital of the Lagash kingdom and continued to be its religious center after political power had shifted to city of Lagash. During the Ur III period, Girsu was a major administrative center for the empire. After the fall of Ur, Girsu declined in importance, but remained inhabited until . A 4th century BC bilingual Greek/Aramaic inscription was found there.

Archaeology
The site consists of two main mounds, one rising 50 feet above the plain and
the other 56 feet. A number of small mounds dot the site. Telloh was the first Sumerian site to be extensively excavated, at first under the French vice-consul at Basra, Ernest de Sarzec, in eleven campaigns between 1877 and 1900, followed by his successor Gaston Cros from 1903–1909. Finds included an alabaster statue of a woman, with copper bracelets coated in gold and a fragment of a stone lion carved dish with a partial Sumerian inscription. In 1879 the site was visited by Hormuzd Rassam.

Excavations continued under Abbé Henri de Genouillac in 1929–1931 and under André Parrot in 1931–1933. It was at Girsu that the fragments of the Stele of the Vultures were found. The site has suffered from poor excavation standards and also from illegal excavations. About 50,000 cuneiform tablets have been recovered from the site.  

Excavations at Telloh resumed in 2016 as part of a training program for Iraqi archaeologists organized by the British Museum. A foundation tablet and a number of inscribed building cones have been found. In the 5th season, in autumn 2019, work concentrated on the Mound of the Palace where E-ninnu, a temple to Ningirsu, had been found in earlier seasons. In March 2020, archaeologists announced the discovery of a 5,000-year-old cultic area filled with more than 300 broken ceremonial ceramic cups, bowls, jars, animal sacrifices, and ritual processions dedicated to Ningirsu. One of the remains was a duck-shaped bronze figurine with eyes made from bark which is thought to be dedicated to Nanshe. An Indus Valley weight was also found. In February 2023, archaeologists from British Museum and Getty Museum revealed the remains of the 4,500 year-old Sumerian Lord Palace of the Kings alongside more than 200 cuneiform tablets containing administrative records of Girsu. The E-ninnu temple (Temple of the White Thunderbird), the primary sanctuary of the Sumerian warrior god Ningirsu was also identified during the excavations.

Gallery

Ubaid IV artifacts (4700–4200 BC) in Girsu

Uruk Period artifacts (4000–3100)

Early dynastic artifacts in Girsu (3rd millennium BC)

See also

Gudea cylinders
Ningirsu
Statues of Gudea
Cities of the ancient Near East

Notes

Further reading
Barrelet, Marie-Thérèse, "Une ‘Construction Enigmatique’ a Tello", Iraq, vol. 27, no. 2, pp. 100–18, 1965
CAUVIN, Marie-Claire, "TELLO ET L’ORIGINE DE LA HOUE AU PROCHE-ORIENT", Paléorient, vol. 5, pp. 193–206, 1979
CROS, Gaston, "NOTE RECTIFICATIVE: SUR LE CASQUE CHALDÉEN DE TELLO: LETTRE DE M. LE COMMANDANT GASTON CROS", Revue d’Assyriologie et d’archéologie Orientale, vol. 6, no. 3, pp. 88–89, 1906
de Vaumas, Etienne, "L’Ecoulement Des Eaux En Mesopotamie et La Provenance Des Eaux de Tello", Iraq, vol. 27, no. 2, pp. 81–99, 1965
DANGIN, François THUREAU, "NOTICE SUR LA TROISIÈME COLLECTION DE TABLETTES: DÉCOUVERTE PAR M. DE SARZEC A TELLO", Revue d’Assyriologie et d’archéologie Orientale, vol. 5, no. 3, pp. 67–102, 1902
Donbaz, Veysel, and Foster, Benjamin R., "Sargonic Texts from Telloh in the Istanbul Archaeological Museum", Occasional Publications of the Babylonian Fund 5, Philadelphia: The University Museum, 1982 ISBN 9780934718448
Chiera, Edward, "Selected temple accounts from Telloh, Yokha and Drehem", University of Pennsylvania, 1921
Harriet Crawford, 'The Construction Inférieure at Tello. A Reassessment', Iraq, vol. 49, pp. 71–76, 1987
Benjamin R. Foster, 'The Sargonic Victory Stele from Telloh', Iraq, Vol. 47, pp. 15–30, 1985
Foster, Benjamin R., "Sargonic Texts from Telloh in the Istanbul Archaeological Museums, Part 2", ISD LLC, 2018 ISBN 9781948488082
de GENOUILLAC, H., "RAPPORT SUR LES TRAVAUX DE LA MISSION DE TELLO: II          E          CAMPAGNE : 1929—1930", Revue d’Assyriologie et d’archéologie Orientale, vol. 27, no. 4, pp. 169–86, 1930
Leon Heuzey, "MISSION FRANÇAISE DE CHALDÉE: REPRISE DES FOUILLES DE TELLO", Revue d’Assyriologie et d’archéologie Orientale, vol. 6, no. 1, pp. 1–4, 1904
Laurito, Romina, "Clay sealings from Telloh: new evidence from a 3rd millennium BC "corpus"", Pathways through Arslantepe. Essays in Honour of Marcella Frangipane, hrsg. v. Balossi Restelli, Francesca, 2020
Claudia E. Suter, 'A Shulgi Statuette from Tello', Journal of Cuneiform Studies, vol. 43/45, pp. 63–70, (1991–1993)
PARROT, André, "LES FOUILLES DE TELLO ET DE SENKEREH-LARSA: CAMPAGNE 1932-1933 (Rapport Préliminaire)", Revue d’Assyriologie et d’archéologie Orientale, vol. 30, no. 4, pp. 169–82, 1933
PARROT, André, "FOUILLES DE TELLO: CAMPAGNE 1931-1932 (Rapport Préliminaire)", Revue d’Assyriologie et d’archéologie Orientale, vol. 29, no. 2, pp. 45–57, 1932
Sébastien Rey, 'Divine Cults in the Sacred Precinct of Girsu', Near Eastern Archaeology; Chicago, vol. 84, iss. 2, pp. 130-139, June 2021
Sébastien Rey, "For the Gods of Girsu: City-State Formation in Ancient Sumer", Archaeopress Archaeology, 2016

External links
The British Museum’s Heritage Initiative is helping to uncover remains of a lost palace in Iraq - UK Daily - 17 February 2023
5,000-year-old artifacts unearthed in Sumerian city of Girsu in Iraq - Daily Sabah - Nov 17, 2021
Fragment of a stone plaque depicting Enannatum found in Tello (Girsu), from the collection of the British Museum, on the site of Google Cultural Institute
Images of Girsu - Oriental Institute of the University of Chicago
Stele of the Vultures at the Louvre
The world's oldest bridge is being preserved in Iraq
The Iraq Emergency Heritage Management Training Scheme: an update
Excavations at Girsu Video - British Museum

Populated places established in the 3rd millennium BC
Populated places disestablished in the 2nd century BC
Sumerian cities
Archaeological sites in Iraq
Dhi Qar Governorate
Former populated places in Iraq
Early Dynastic Period (Mesopotamia)

fr:Lagash#Girsu/Tello